The red-tailed hawk (Buteo jamaicensis) is a bird of prey that breeds throughout most of North America, from the interior of Alaska and northern Canada to as far south as Panama and the West Indies. It is one of the most common members within the genus of Buteo in North America or worldwide. The red-tailed hawk is one of three species colloquially known in the United States as the "chickenhawk", though it rarely preys on standard-sized chickens. The bird is sometimes also referred to as the red-tail for short, when the meaning is clear in context. Red-tailed hawks can acclimate to all the biomes within their range, occurring on the edges of non-ideal habitats such as dense forests and sandy deserts. The red-tailed hawk occupies a wide range of habitats and altitudes, including deserts, grasslands (from small meadows to the treed fringes of more extensive prairies), coniferous and deciduous forests, agricultural fields, and urban areas. Its latitudinal limits fall around the tree line in the subarctic and it is absent from the high Arctic. Generally it favors varied habitats with open woodland, woodland edge and open terrain. It is legally protected in Canada, Mexico, and the United States by the Migratory Bird Treaty Act.

The 14 recognized subspecies vary in appearance and range, varying most often in color, and in the west of North America, red-tails are particularly often strongly polymorphic, with individuals ranging from almost white to nearly all black. The subspecies Harlan's hawk (B. j. harlani) is sometimes considered a separate species (B. harlani). This species displays sexual dimorphism in size, with females averaging about 25% heavier than males.

The diet of red-tailed hawks is highly variable and reflects their status as opportunistic generalists, but in North America, they are most often  predators of small mammals such as rodents of an immense diversity of families and species. Prey that is terrestrial and at least partially diurnal is preferred, so types such as ground squirrels are preferred where they naturally occur. Over much of the range, smallish rodents such as voles alternated with larger rabbits and hares often collectively form the bulk of the diet. Large numbers of birds and reptiles can occur in the diet in several areas, and can even be the primary foods. Meanwhile, amphibians, fish and invertebrates can seem rare in the hawk’s regular diet, but they are not infrequently taken by immature hawks. Red-tailed hawks may survive on islands absent of native mammals on diets variously including invertebrates such as crabs, as well as lizards or birds. Like many Buteo species, they hunt from a perch most often, but can vary their hunting techniques where prey and habitat demand it. Because they are so common and easily trained as capable hunters, in the United States they are the most commonly captured hawks for falconry. Falconers are permitted to take only passage hawks (which have left the nest, are on their own, but are less than a year old) so as to not affect the breeding population. Adults, which may be breeding or rearing chicks, may not be taken for falconry purposes, and doing so is illegal. Passage red-tailed hawks are also preferred by falconers because these younger birds have not yet developed the adult behaviors that would make them more difficult to train.

Taxonomy 
The red-tailed hawk was formally described in 1788 by German naturalist Johann Friedrich Gmelin under the binomial name Falco jamaicensis. Gmelin based his description on the "cream-coloured buzzard" described in 1781 by John Latham in his A General Synopsis of Birds. The type locality is Jamaica. The red-tailed hawk is now placed in the genus Buteo that was erected by French naturalist Bernard Germain de Lacépède in 1799.

The red-tailed hawk is a member of the subfamily Buteoninae, which includes about 55 currently recognized species. Unlike many lineages of accipitrids, which seemed to have radiated out of Africa or south Asia, the Buteoninae clearly originated in the Americas based on fossil records and current species distributions (more than 75% of the extant hawks from this lineage are found in the Americas). As a subfamily, the Buteoninae seem to be rather old based on genetic materials, with monophyletic genera bearing several million years of individual evolution. Diverse in plumage appearance, habitat, prey, and nesting preferences, buteonine hawks are nonetheless typically medium- to large-sized hawks with ample wings (while some fossil forms are very large, larger than any eagle alive today). The red-tailed hawk is a member of the genus Buteo, a group of medium-sized raptors with robust bodies and broad wings. Members of this genus are known as "buzzards" in Eurasia, but "hawks" in North America. Under current classification, the genus includes about 29 species, the second-most diverse of all extant accipitrid genera behind only Accipiter. The buzzards of Eurasia and Africa are mostly part of the genus Buteo, although two other small genera within the subfamily Buteoninae occur in Africa.

At one time, the rufous-tailed hawk (B. ventralis), distributed in Patagonia and some other areas of southern South America, was considered part of the red-tailed hawk species. With a massive distributional gap consisting of most of South America, the rufous-tailed hawk is considered a separate species now, but the two hawks still compromise a "species pair" or superspecies, as they are clearly closely related. The rufous-tailed hawk, while comparatively little studied, is very similar to the red-tailed hawk, being about the same size and possessing the same wing structure, and having more or less parallel nesting and hunting habits. Physically, however, rufous-tailed hawk adults do not attain a bright brick-red tail as do red-tailed hawks, instead retaining a dark brownish-cinnamon tail with many blackish crossbars similar to juvenile red-tailed hawks. Another, more well-known, close relative to the red-tailed hawk is the common buzzard (B. buteo), which has been considered as its Eurasian "broad ecological counterpart" and may also be within a species complex with red-tailed hawks. The common buzzard, in turn, is also part of a species complex with other Old World buzzards, namely the mountain buzzard (B. oreophilus), the forest buzzard (B. trizonatus ), and the Madagascar buzzard (B. brachypterus). All six species, although varying notably in size and plumage characteristics, in the alleged species complex that contains the red-tailed hawk share with it the feature of the blackish patagium marking, which is missing in most other Buteo spp.

Subspecies
At least 14 recognized subspecies of B. jamaicensis are described, which vary in range and in coloration. Not all authors accept every subspecies, though, particularly some of the insular races of the tropics (which differ only slightly in some cases from the nearest mainland forms) and particularly  Krider's hawk, by far the most controversial red-tailed hawk race, as few authors agree on its suitability as a full-fledged subspecies.

Description 

Red-tailed hawk plumage can be variable, depending on the subspecies and the region. These color variations are morphs, and are not related to molting. The western North American population, B. j. calurus, is the most variable subspecies and has three main color morphs: light, dark, and intermediate or rufous. The dark and intermediate morphs constitute 10–20% of the population in the Western United States, but seem to constitute only 1–2% of B. j. calurus in western Canada. A whitish underbelly with a dark brown band across the belly, formed by horizontal streaks in feather patterning, is present in most color variations. This feature is variable in eastern hawks and generally absent in some light subspecies (i.e. B. j. fuertesi). Most adult red-tails have a dark-brown nape and upper head, which gives them a somewhat hooded appearance, while the throat can variably present a lighter brown "necklace". Especially in younger birds, the underside may be otherwise covered with dark-brown spotting, and some adults may too manifest this stippling. The back is usually a slightly darker brown than elsewhere with paler scapular feathers, ranging from tawny to white, forming a variable imperfect "V" on the back. The tail of most adults, which gives this species its name, is rufous brick-red above with a variably sized, black subterminal band and generally appears light buff-orange from below. In comparison, the typical pale immatures (i.e. less than two years old) typically have a mildly paler headed and tend to show a darker back than adults with more apparent pale wing-feather edges above (for descriptions of dark morph juveniles from B. j. calurus, which is also generally apt for description of rare dark morphs of other races, see under that subspecies description). In immature red-tailed hawks of all morphs, the tail is a light brown above with numerous small dark brown bars of roughly equal width, but these tend to be much broader on dark morph birds. Even in young red-tails, the tail may be a somewhat rufous tinge of brown. The bill is relatively short and dark, in the hooked shape characteristic of raptors, and the head can sometimes appear small in size against the thick body frame. The cere, the legs, and the feet of the red-tailed hawk are all yellow, as is the color of bare parts in many accipitrids of different lineages. Immature birds can be readily identified at close range by their yellowish irises. As the bird attains full maturity over the course of 3–4 years, the iris slowly darkens into a reddish-brown, which is the adult eye-color in all races. Seen in flight, adults usually have dark brown along the lower edge of the wings, against a mostly pale wing, which bares light brownish barring. Individually, the underwing coverts can range from all dark to off-whitish (most often more heavily streaked with brown) which contrasts with a distinctive black patagium marking. The wing coloring of adults and immatures is similar but for typical pale morph immatures having somewhat heavier brownish markings.

Though the markings and color vary across the subspecies, the basic appearance of the red-tailed hawk is relatively consistent.

Overall, this species is blocky and broad in shape, often appearing (and being) heavier than other Buteos of similar length. They are the heaviest Buteos on average in eastern North America, albeit scarcely ahead of the larger winged rough-legged buzzard (Buteo lagopus), and second only in size in the west to the ferruginous hawk (Buteo regalis). Red-tailed hawks may be anywhere from the fifth to the ninth heaviest Buteo in the world depending on what figures are used. However, in the northwestern United States, ferruginous hawk females are 35% heavier than female red-tails from the same area. On average, western red-tailed hawks are relatively longer winged and lankier proportioned but are slightly less stocky, compact and heavy than eastern red-tailed hawks in North America. Eastern hawks may also have mildly larger talons and bills than western ones. Based on comparisons of morphology and function amongst all accipitrids, these features imply that western red-tails may need to vary their hunting more frequently to on the wing as the habitat diversifies to more open situations and presumably would hunt more variable and faster prey, whereas the birds of the east, which was historically well-wooded, are more dedicated perch hunters and can take somewhat larger prey but are likely more dedicated mammal hunters. In terms of size variation, red-tailed hawks run almost contrary to Bergmann's rule (i.e. that northern animals should be larger in relation than those closer to the Equator within a species) as one of the northernmost subspecies, B. j. alascensis, is the second smallest race based on linear dimensions and that two of the most southerly occurring races in the United States, B. j. fuertesi and B. j. umbrinus, respectively, are the largest proportioned of all red-tailed hawks. Red-tailed hawks tend have a relatively short but broad tails and thick, chunky wings. Although often described as long-winged, the proportional size of the wings is quite small and red-tails have high wing loading for a buteonine hawk. For comparison, two other widespread Buteo hawks in North America were found to weigh:  for every square centimeter of wing area in the rough-legged buzzard (B. lagopus) and /cm2 in the red-shouldered hawk (B. lineatus).

As is the case with many raptors, the red-tailed hawk displays sexual dimorphism in size, as females are on average 25% larger than males. As is typical in large raptors, frequently reported mean body mass for red-tailed hawks is somewhat higher than expansive research reveals. Part of this weight variation is seasonal fluctuations; hawks tend to be heavier in winter than during migration or especially during the trying summer breeding season, and also due to clinal variation. Furthermore, immature hawks are usually lighter in mass than their adult counterparts despite having somewhat longer wings and tails. The largest known survey of body mass in red-tailed hawks is still credited to Craighead and Craighead (1956), who found 100 males to average  and 108 females to average . However, these figures were apparently taken from labels on museum specimens, from natural history collections in Wisconsin and Pennsylvania, without note to the region, age, or subspecies of the specimens. Size variation in body mass reveals that the red-tailed hawk typically varies only a modest amount and that size differences are geographically inconsistent.

The tail measures  in length.

Identification

Although they overlap in range with most other American diurnal raptors, identifying most mature red-tailed hawks to species is relatively straightforward, particularly if viewing a typical adult at a reasonable distance. The red-tailed hawk is the only North American hawk with a rufous tail and a blackish patagium marking on the leading edge of its wing (which is obscured only on dark morph adults and Harlan’s hawks by similarly dark-colored feathers). Other larger adult Buteo spp. in North America usually have obvious distinct markings that are absent in red-tails, whether the rufous-brown "beard" of Swainson's hawks (B. swainsonii) or the colorful rufous belly and shoulder markings and striking black-and-white mantle of red-shouldered hawks (also the small "windows" seen at the end of their primaries). In perched individuals, even as silhouettes, the shape of large Buteo spp. may be distinctive, such as the wingtips overhanging the tail in several other species, but not in red-tails. North American Buteo spp. range from the dainty, compact builds of much smaller ones, such as broad-winged hawk (B. platypterus) to the heavyset, neckless look of ferruginous hawks or the rough-legged buzzards, which have a compact, smaller appearance than a red-tail in perched birds due to its small bill, short neck, and much shorter tarsi, while the opposite effect occurs in flying rough-legs with their much bigger wing area. In flight, most other large North American Buteo spp. are distinctly longer and more slender-winged than red-tailed hawks, with the much paler ferruginous hawk having peculiarly slender wings in relation to its massive, chunky body. Swainson's hawks are distinctly darker on the wing and ferruginous hawks are much paler-winged than typical red-tailed hawks. Pale morph adult ferruginous hawk can show mildly tawny-pink (but never truly rufous) upper tail, and like red-tails tend to have dark markings on underwing-coverts and can have a dark belly band, but compared to red-tailed hawks have a distinctly broader head, their remiges are much whiter looking with very small, dark primary tips, they lack the red-tail's diagnostic patagial marks and usually also lack the dark subterminal tail-band, and ferruginous hawks have  totally feathered tarsi. With its whitish head, the ferruginous hawk is most similar to Krider's red-tailed hawks, especially in immature plumage, but the larger hawk has broader head and narrower wing shape, and the ferruginous immatures are paler underneath and on their legs. Several species share a belly band with the typical red-tailed hawk, but they vary from subtle (as in the ferruginous hawk) to solid blackish, the latter in most light-morph rough-legged buzzards. More difficult to identify among adult red-tails are their darkest variations, as most species of Buteo in North America also have dark morphs. Western dark morph red-tails (i.e. B. j. calurus) adults, however, retain the typical distinctive brick-red tail, which other species lack, and may stand out even more against the otherwise all chocolate-brown to black bird. Standard pale juveniles when perched show a whitish patch in the outer half of the upper surface of the wing, which other juvenile Buteo spp. lack. The most difficult to identify stages and plumage types are dark morph juveniles, Harlan's hawk and some Krider's hawks (the latter mainly with typical ferruginous hawks as mentioned). Some darker juveniles are similar enough to other Buteo juveniles that they "cannot be identified to species with any confidence under various field conditions." However, field identification techniques have advanced in the last few decades and most experienced hawk-watchers can distinguish even the most vexingly plumaged immature hawks, especially as the wing shapes of each species becomes apparent after seeing many. Harlan’s hawks are most similar to dark morph rough-legged buzzards and dark morph ferruginous hawks. Wing shape is the most reliable identification tool for distinguishing Harlan's hawks from these, but also the pale streaking on the breast of Harlan's, which tends to be conspicuous in most individuals, and is lacking in the other hawks. Also, dark morph ferruginous hawks do not have the dark subterminal band of a Harlan's hawk, but do bear a black undertail covert lacking in Harlan's.

Vocalization 
The cry of the red-tailed hawk is a 2- to 3-second, hoarse, rasping scream, variously transcribed as kree-eee-ar, tsee-eeee-arrr or sheeeeee, that begins at a high pitch and slurs downward. This cry is often described as sounding similar to a steam whistle. The red-tailed hawk frequently vocalizes while hunting or soaring, but vocalizes loudest and most persistently in defiance or anger, in response to a predator or a rival hawk's intrusion into its territory. At close range, it makes a croaking guh-runk, possibly as a warning sound. Nestlings may give peeping notes with a "soft, sleepy quality" that give way to occasional screams as they develop, but those are more likely to be a soft whistle rather than the harsh screams of the adults. Their latter hunger call, given from 11 days (as recorded in Alaska) to  after fledgling (in California), is different, a two-syllabled, wailing klee-uk food cry exerted by the young when parents leave the nest or enter their field of vision. A strange mechanical sound "not very unlike the rush of distant water" has been reported as uttered in the midst of a sky-dance. A modified call of chirp-chwirk is given during courtship, while a low key, duck-like nasal gank may be given by pairs when they are relaxed.

The fierce, screaming cry of the adult red-tailed hawk is frequently used as a generic raptor sound effect in television shows and other media, even if the bird featured is not a red-tailed hawk. It is especially used in depictions of the bald eagle, which contributes to the common misconception that it is a bald eagle cry; actual bald eagle vocalizations are far softer and more chirpy than those of a red-tailed hawk.

Distribution and habitat 

The red-tailed hawk is one of the most widely distributed of all raptors in the Americas. It occupies the largest breeding range of any diurnal raptor north of the Mexican border, just ahead of the American kestrel (Falco sparverius). While the peregrine falcon (Falco peregrinus) has a greater latitudinal distribution as a nester in North America, its range as a breeding species is far more sporadic and sparse than that of red-tailed hawks. The red-tailed hawk breeds from nearly north-central Alaska, the Yukon, and a considerable portion of the Northwest Territories, there reaching as far as a breeder as Inuvik, Mackenzie River Delta and skirting the southern shores of Great Bear Lake and Great Slave Lake. Thereafter in northern Canada, breeding red-tails continue to northern Saskatchewan and across to north-central Ontario east to central Quebec and the Maritime Provinces of Canada, and south continuously to Florida. No substantial gaps occur throughout the entire contiguous United States, where breeding red-tailed hawks do not occur. Along the Pacific, their range includes all of Baja California, including Islas Marías, and Socorro Island in the Revillagigedo Islands. On the mainland, breeding red-tails are found continuously to Oaxaca, then experience a brief gap at the Isthmus of Tehuantepec thereafter subsequently continuing from Chiapas through central Guatemala on to northern Nicaragua. To the south, the population in highlands from Costa Rica to central Panama is isolated from breeding birds in Nicaragua. Further east, breeding red-tailed hawks occur in the West Indies in north Bahamas (i.e. Grand Bahama, Abaco and Andros) and all larger islands (such as Cuba, Jamaica, Hispaniola, and Puerto Rico) and into the northern Lesser Antilles (Virgin Islands, Saint Barthélemy, Saba, Saint Kitts, and Nevis, being rare as a resident on Saint Eustatius and are probably extinct on Saint Martin). Their typical winter range stretches from southern Canada south throughout the remainder of the breeding range.

Red-tailed hawks have shown the ability to become habituated to almost any habitat present in North and Central America. Their preferred habitat is mixed forest and field, largely woodland edge with tall trees or alternately high bluffs that may be used as nesting and perching sites. They occupy a wide range of habitats and altitudes, including deserts, grasslands, nearly any coastal or wetland habitat, mountains, foothills, coniferous and deciduous woodlands, and tropical rainforests. Agricultural fields and pastures, which are more often than not varied with groves, ridges, or streamside trees in most parts of America, may make nearly ideal habitat for breeding or wintering red-tails. They also adapt well to suburban areas especially ones with tall trees or any kind of parkland. Some red-tails may survive or even flourish in urban areas, usually hunting and roosting in available urban parks, cemeteries, road verges, and so on, and nesting freely either in trees or virtually any tall man-made structures. One famous urban red-tailed hawk, known as "Pale Male", became the subject of a nonfiction book, Red-Tails in Love: A Wildlife Drama in Central Park, and is the first known red-tail in decades to successfully nest and raise young in the crowded New York City borough of Manhattan. As studied in Syracuse, New York, the highway system has been very beneficial to red-tails as it juxtaposed trees and open areas and blocks human encroachment with fences, with the red-tailed hawks easily becoming acclimated to car traffic. The only practice that has a negative effect on the highway-occupying red-tails is the planting of exotic Phragmites, which may occasionally obscure otherwise ideal highway habitat.

In the northern Great Plains, the widespread practices of wildfire suppression and planting of exotic trees by humans has allowed groves of aspen and various other trees to invade what was once vast, almost continuous prairie grasslands, causing grassland obligates such as ferruginous hawks to decline and allowing parkland-favoring red-tails to flourish. To the contrary, clear-cutting of mature woodlands in New England, resulting in only fragmented and isolated stands of trees or low second growth remaining, was recorded to also benefit red-tailed hawks, despite being to the determent of breeding red-shouldered hawks. The red-tailed hawk, as a whole, rivals the peregrine falcon and the great horned owl among raptorial birds in the use of diverse habitats in North America. Beyond the high Arctic (as they discontinue as a breeder at the tree line),  few other areas exist  where red-tailed hawks are absent or rare in North and Central America. Some areas of unbroken forest, especially lowland tropical forests, rarely host red-tailed hawks, although they can occupy forested tropical highlands surprisingly well. In deserts, they can only occur where some variety of arborescent growth or ample rocky bluffs or canyons occur.

Behavior 

The red-tailed hawk is highly conspicuous to humans in much of its daily behavior. Most birds in resident populations, which are well more than half of all red-tailed hawks, usually split nonbreeding-season activity between territorial soaring flight and sitting on a perch. Often, perching is for hunting purposes, but many sit on a tree branch for hours, occasionally stretching on a single wing or leg to keep limber, with no signs of hunting intent. Wintering typical pale-morph hawks in Arkansas were found to perch in open areas near the top of tall, isolated trees, whereas dark morphs more frequently perched in dense groups of trees. For many, and perhaps most, red-tailed hawks being mobbed by various birds is a daily concern and can effectively disrupt many of their daily behaviors. Mostly larger passerines, of multiple families from tyrant flycatchers to icterids,  mob red-tails, despite other raptors, such as Accipiter hawks and falcons, being a notably greater danger to them. The most aggressive and dangerous attacker as such is likely to be various crows or other corvids, i.e. American crows (Corvus brachyrhynchos), because a mobbing group (or "murder") of them can number up to as many as 75 crows, which may cause grievous physical harm to a solitary hawk, and if the hawks are nesting, separate the parent hawks and endanger the eggs or nestlings within their nest to predation by crows. Birds that mob red-tailed hawks can tell how distended the hawk's crop is (i.e. the upper chest and throat area being puffy versus flat-feathered and sleek), thus mob more often when the hawk is presumably about to hunt.

Flight 

In flight, this hawk soars with wings often in a slight dihedral, flapping as little as possible to conserve energy. Soaring is by far the most efficient method of flight for red-tailed hawks, so is used more often than not. Active flight is slow and deliberate, with deep wing beats. Wing beats are somewhat less rapid in active flight than in most other Buteo hawks, even heavier species such as ferruginous hawks tend to flap more swiftly, due to the morphology of the wings. In wind, it occasionally hovers on beating wings and remains stationary above the ground, but this flight method is rarely employed by this species. Although North American red-tailed hawks will occasionally hunt from flight, a great majority of flight by red-tails in this area is for non-hunting purpose. During nest defense, red-tailed hawks may be capable of surprisingly swift, vigorous flight, while repeatedly diving at perceived threats.

Migration
Red-tailed hawks are considered partial migrants, as in about the northern third of their distribution, which is most of their range in Canada and Alaska, they almost entirely vacate their breeding grounds. In coastal areas of the north, however, such as in the Pacific Northwest  to southern Alaska and in Nova Scotia on the Atlantic, red-tailed hawks do not usually migrate. More or less, any area where snow cover is nearly continuous during the winter shows an extended absence of most red-tailed hawks, so some areas as far south as Montana may show strong seasonal vacancies of red-tails. In southern Michigan, immature red-tailed hawks tended to remain in winter only when voles were abundant. During relatively long,  harsh winters in Michigan, many more young ones were reported in northeastern Mexico. To the opposite extreme, hawks residing as far north as Fairbanks, Alaska, may persevere through the winter on their home territory, as was recorded with one male over three consecutive years. Birds of any age tend to be territorial during winter but may shift ranges whenever food requirements demand it. Wintering birds tend to perch on inconspicuous tree perches, seeking shelter especially if they have a full crop or are in the midst of poor or overly windy weather. Adult wintering red-tails tend to perch more prominently than immatures do, which select lower or more secluded perches. Immatures are often missed in winter bird counts, unless they are being displaced by dominant adults. Generally, though, immatures can seem to recognize that they are less likely to be attacked by adults during winter and can perch surprisingly close to them. Age is the most significant consideration of wintering hawks' hierarchy, but size does factor in, as larger immatures (presumably usually females) are less likely to displaced than smaller ones. Dark adult red-tailed hawks appear to be harder to locate when perched than other red-tails. In Oklahoma, for example, wintering adult Harlan's hawks were rarely engaged in fights or chased by other red-tails. These hawks tended to gather in regional pockets and frequently the same ones occurred year-to-year. In general, migratory behavior is complex and reliant on each individual hawk's decision-making (i.e. whether prey populations are sufficient to entice the hawk to endure prolonged snow cover). During fall migration, departure may occur as soon as late September, but peak movements occur in late October and all of November in the United States, with migration ceasing after mid-December. The northernmost migrants may pass over resident red-tailed hawks in the contiguous United States, while the latter are still in the midst of brooding fledglings. Not infrequently, several autumn hawk watches in Ontario, Quebec, and the northern United States record 4,500–8,900 red-tailed hawks migrating through each fall, with records of up to 15,000 in a season at Hawk Ridge hawk watch in Duluth, Minnesota. Unlike some other Buteo spp., such as Swainson's hawks and broad-winged hawks, red-tailed hawks do not usually migrate in groups, instead passing by one-by-one, and only migrate on days when winds are favorable. Most migrants do not move past southern Mexico in late autumn, but a few North American migrants may annually move as far south as breeding red-tailed hawks happen to occur, i.e. in Central America to as far south Panama. However, a few records were reported of wintering migrant red-tails turning up in Colombia, the first records of them anywhere in South America. Spring northward movements may commence as early as late February, with peak numbers usually occurring in late March and early April. Seasonal counts may include up to 19,000 red-tails in spring at Derby Hill hawk watch, in Oswego, New York, sometimes more than 5,000 are recorded in a day there. The most northerly migratory individuals may not reach breeding grounds until June, even adults.

Immature hawks migrate later than adults in spring on average, but not, generally speaking, in autumn. In the northern Great Lakes, immatures return in late May to early June, when adults are already well into their nesting season and must find unoccupied ranges. In Alaska, adults tend to migrate before immatures in early to mid-September, to the contrary of other areas, probably as heavy snowfall begins. Yearlings that were banded in southwestern Idaho stayed for about 2 months after fledging, and then traveled long distances with a strong directional bias, with 9 of 12 recovered southeast of the study area- six of these moved south to coastal lowlands in Mexico] and as far as Guatemala,  from their initial banding. In California, 35 hawks were banded as nestlings; 26 were recovered at less than 50 miles away, with multidirectional juvenile dispersals. Nestlings banded in Green County, Wisconsin, did not travel very far comparatively by October–November, but by December, recoveries were found in states including Illinois, Iowa, Texas, Louisiana, and Florida.

Diet

The red-tailed hawk is carnivorous, and a highly opportunistic feeder. Nearly any small animal they encounter may be viewed as potential food. Their most common prey are small mammals such as rodents and lagomorphs, but they also consume birds, reptiles, fish, amphibians, and invertebrates. Prey varies considerably with regional and seasonal availability, but usually centers on rodents, accounting for up to 85% of a hawk's diet. In total, nearly 500 prey species have been recorded in their diet, almost as many as  great horned owls have been recorded as taking. When 27 North American studies are reviewed, mammals make up 65.3% of the diet by frequency, 20.9% by birds, 10.8% by reptiles, 2.8% by invertebrates, and 0.2% by amphibians and fish. The daily food requirements range from 7 to 11.2% of their own body weight, so that about three voles or the equivalent weight are required daily for a typical range adult.

In fact, the talons of red-tails in some areas averaged of similar size to those of ferruginous hawks which can be considerably heavier and notably larger than those of the only slightly lighter Swainson's hawk. Owing to its morphology, red-tailed hawks generally can attack larger prey than other Buteo hawks typically can, and are capable of selecting the largest prey of up to their own size available at the time of hunting, though in all likelihood numerically most prey probably weighs on average about 20% of the hawk's own weight (as is typical of many birds of prey). Red-tailed hawks usually hunt by watching for prey activity from a high perch, also known as still hunting. Upon being spotted, prey is dropped down upon by the hawk. Red-tails often select the highest available perches within a given environment, since the greater the height they are at, the less flapping is required and the faster the downward glide they can attain toward nearby prey. If prey is closer than average, the hawk may glide at a steep downward angle with few flaps, if farther than average, it may flap a few swift wingbeats alternating with glides. Perch hunting is the most successful hunting method generally speaking for red-tailed hawks and can account for up to 83% of their daily activities (i.e. in winter). Wintering pairs may join together and aseasonally may join forces to group hunt agile prey that they may have trouble catching by themselves, such as tree squirrels. This may consist of stalking opposites sides of a tree, to surround the squirrel and almost inevitably drive the rodent to be captured by one after being flushed by the other hawk. 

This method is less successful than perch hunting, but seems relatively useful for capturing small birds and may show the best results while hunting in hilly country. Hunting red-tailed hawks readily use trees, bushes, or rocks for concealment before making a surprise attack, even showing a partial ability to dodge among trees in an Accipiter-like fashion. Among thick stands of spruce in Alaska, a dodging hunting flight was thought to be unusually important to red-tails living in extensive areas of conifers, with hawks even coming to the ground and walking hurriedly in prey pursuit especially if the prey was large, a similar behavior to goshawks. Additional surprisingly swift aerial hunting has reported in red-tails that habitually hunt bats in Texas. Here, the bat-hunting specialists  stooped with half-closed wings, quite falcon-like, plowing through the huge stream of bats exiting their cave roosts, then zooming upwards with a bat in its talons. These hawks also flew parallel closely to the stream, then veer sharply into it and seize a bat. In the neotropics, red-tails have shown the ability to dodge amongst forest canopy whilst hunting. In Kansas, red-tailed hawks were recorded sailing to catch flying insects, a hunting method more typical of a Swainson's hawk. Alternately, they may drop to the ground to forage for insects like grasshoppers and beetles as well as other invertebrates and probably amphibians and fish (except by water in the latter cases). Hunting afoot seems to be particularly prevalent among immatures. Young red-tailed hawks in northeastern Florida were recorded often extracting earthworms from near the surface of the ground and some had a crop full of earthworms after rains. Ground hunting is also quite common on Socorro Island, where no native land mammals occur, and invertebrates are more significant to their overall diet. A red-tailed hawk was observed to incorporate an unconventional killing method, which was drowning a heron immediately after capture. One red-tailed hawk was seen to try to grab a young ground squirrel and, upon missing it, screamed loudly, which in turn caused another young squirrel to break into a run, wherein it was captured. Whether this was an intentional hunting technique needs investigation. Upon capture, smaller prey is taken to a feeding perch, which is almost always lower than a hunting perch. Among small prey, rodents are often swallowed whole, as are shrews and small snakes, while birds are plucked and beheaded. Even prey as small as chipmunks may take two or three bites to consume. Larger mammals of transportable size are at times beheaded and have part of their fur discarded, then leftovers are either stored in a tree or fall to the ground. Large prey, especially if too heavy to transport on the wing, is often dragged to a secluded spot and dismantled in various ways. If they can successfully carry what remains to a low perch, they tend to feed until full and then discard the rest.

Mammals

Rodents are certainly the type of prey taken most often by frequency, but their contribution to prey biomass at nests can be regionally low, and the type, variety and importance of rodent prey can be highly variable. In total, well over 100 rodent species have turned up the diet of red-tailed hawks. At least some attacks on adult marmots like groundhogs (Marmota monax) are abortive. At times, the red-tailed hawk is thought of as a semi-specialized vole-catcher, but voles are a subsistence food that are more or less are taken until larger prey such as rabbits and squirrels can be captured. In an area of Michigan, immature hawks took almost entirely voles but adults were diversified feeders. Indeed, the  meadow vole (Microtus pennsylvanicus) was the highest frequency prey species in 27 dietary studies across North America, accounting for up to 54% of the food at nests by frequency. It is quite rare for any one species to make up more than half of the food at any dietary study for red-tailed hawks. In total about 9 Microtus species are known in the overall diet, with 5 other voles and lemmings known to be included in their prey spectrum. Another well-represented species was the  prairie vole (Microtus ochrogaster), which were the primary food, making up 26.4% of a sample of 1322, in eastern Kansas. While crepuscular in primary feeding activity, voles are known to be active both day and night, and so are reliable food for hawks than most non-squirrel rodents, which generally are nocturnal in activity. Indeed, most other microtine rodents are largely inaccessible to red-tailed hawks due to their strongly nocturnal foraging patterns, even though 24 species outside of voles and lemmings are known to be hunted. Woodrats are taken as important supplemental prey in some regions, being considerably larger than most other crictetid rodents, and some numbers of North American deermouse (Peromyscus maniculatus) may turn up. The largest representation of the latter species was contributing 11.9% of the diet in the Great Basin of Utah, making them the second best represented prey species there. Considering this limited association with nocturnal rodents, the high importance of pocket gophers in the diet of red-tailed hawks is puzzling to many biologists, as these tend to be highly nocturnal and elusive by day, rarely leaving the confines of their burrow. At least 8 species of pocket gopher are included in the prey spectrum (not to mention 5 species of pocket mice). The  northern pocket gopher (Thomomys talpoides) is particularly often reported and, by frequency, even turns up as the third most often recorded prey species in 27 American dietary studies. Presumably, hunting of pocket gophers by red-tails, which has possibly never been witnessed, occurs in dim light at first dawn and last light of dusk when they luck upon a gopher out foraging.

By far, the most important prey among rodents are squirrels, as they are almost fully diurnal. All told, nearly 50 species from the squirrel family have turned up as food. In particular, where they are distributed, ground squirrels are doubly attractive as a primary food source due to their ground dwelling habits, as red-tails prefer to attack prey that is terrestrial. There are also many disadvantages to ground squirrels as prey: they can escape quickly to the security of their burrows, they tend to be highly social and they are very effective and fast in response to alarm calls, and a good deal of species enter hibernation that in the coldest climates can range up to a 6 to 9-month period (although those in warmer climates with little to no snowy weather often have brief dormancy and no true hibernation). Nonetheless, red-tailed hawks are devoted predators of ground squirrels, especially catching incautious ones as they go out foraging (which more often than not are younger animals). A multi-year study conducted on San Joaquin Experimental Range in California, seemingly still the largest food study to date done for red-tailed hawks with 4031 items examined, showed that throughout the seasons the  California ground squirrel (Otospermophilus beecheyi) was the most significant prey, accounting for 60.8% of the breeding season diet and about 27.2% of the diet for hawks year-around. Because of the extremely high density of red-tailed hawks on this range, some pairs came to specialize on diverse alternate prey, which consisted variously of kangaroo rats, lizards, snakes or chipmunks. One pair apparently lessened competition by focusing on pocket gophers instead despite being near the center of ground squirrel activity. In Snake River NCA, the primary food of red-tailed hawks was the  Townsend's ground squirrel (Urocitellus townsendii), which made up nearly 21% of the food in 382 prey items across several years despite sharp spikes and crashes of the ground squirrel population there. The same species was the main food of red-tailed hawks in southeastern Washington, making up 31.2% of 170 items. An even closer predatory relationship was reported in the Centennial valley of Montana and south-central Montana, where 45.4% of 194 prey items and 40.2% of 261 items, respectively, of the food of red-tails consisted of the  Richardson's ground squirrel (Urocitellus richardsonii). Locally in Rochester, Alberta, Richardson's ground squirrel, estimated to average , were secondary in number to unidentified small rodents but red-tails in the region killed an estimated 22–60% of the area’s ground squirrel, a large dent in the squirrel’s population. Further east, ground squirrels are not so reliably distributed, but one study in southern Wisconsin, in one of several quite different dietary studies in that state, the  thirteen-lined ground squirrel (Ictidomys tridecemlineatus) was the main prey species, making up 29.7% of the diet (from a sample of 165).

In Kluane Lake, Yukon,  Arctic ground squirrels (Spermophilus parryii) were the main overall food for Harlan’s red-tailed hawks, making up 30.8% of a sample of 1074 prey items. When these ground squirrels enter their long hibernation, the breeding Harlan’s hawks migrate south for the winter. Nearly as important in Kluane Lake was the  American red squirrel (Tamiasciurus hudsonicus), which constituted 29.8% of the above sample. Red squirrels are highly agile dwellers on dense spruce stands, which has caused biologists to ponder how the red-tailed hawks are able to routinely catch them. It is possible that the hawks catch them on the ground such as when squirrels are digging their caches, but theoretically the dark color of the Harlan’s hawks may allow them to more effectively ambush the squirrels within the forests locally. While American red squirrel turn up not infrequently as supplementary prey elsewhere in North America, other tree squirrels seem to be comparatively infrequently caught, at least during the summer breeding season. It is known that pairs of red-tailed hawks will cooperative hunt tree squirrels at times, probably mostly between late fall and early spring. While adult marmot may be difficult for red-tailed hawks to catch, young marmots are readily taken in numbers after weaning, such as a high frequency of yellow-bellied marmot (Marmota flaviventris) in Boulder, Colorado. Another grouping of squirrels but at the opposite end of the size spectrum for squirrels, the chipmunks are also mostly supplemental prey but are considered more easily caught than tree squirrels, considering that they are more habitual terrestrial foragers.

Outside of rodents, the most important prey for North American red-tailed hawks is rabbits and hares, of which at least 13 species are included in their prey spectrum. By biomass and reproductive success within populations, these are certain to be their most significant food source (at least in North America). Adult Sylvilagus rabbits known to be hunted by red-tails can range from the  brush rabbit (Sylvilagus bachmani) to the Tres Marias rabbit (Sylvilagus graysoni) at  while all leporids hunted may range the  pygmy rabbit (Brachylagus idahoensis) to hares and jackrabbits potentially up twice the hawk’s own weight. While primarily crepuscular in peak activity, rabbits and hares often foraging both during day and night and so face almost constant predatory pressure from a diverse range of predators. Male red-tailed hawks or pairs which are talented rabbit hunters are likely have higher than average productivity due to the size and nutrition of the meal ensuring healthy, fast-growing offspring. Most widely reported are the cottontails, which the three most common North America varieties softly grading into mostly allopatric ranges, being largely segregated by habitat preferences where they overlap in distribution. Namely, in descending order of reportage were: the eastern cottontail (Sylvilagus floridanus), the second most widely reported prey species overall in North America and with maximum percentage known in a given study was 26.4% in Oklahoma (out of 958 prey items), the mountain cottontail (Sylvilagus nuttallii), maximum representation being 17.6% out of a sample of 478 in Kaibab Plateau, Arizona and the desert cottontail (Sylvilagus audubonii), maximum representation being 22.4% out of a sample of 326 in west-central Arizona. Black-tailed jackrabbits (Lepus californicus) are even more intensely focused upon as a food source by the hawks found in the west, particularly the Great Basin. This species is likely the largest prey routinely hunted by red-tails, and the mean prey size where jackrabbits are primarily hunted is the highest known overall. When jackrabbit numbers crash, red-tailed hawk productivity tends to decline as well. In northern Utah, black-tailed jackrabbits made up 55.3% by number of a sample of 329. Elsewhere, they are usually somewhat secondary by number. Prime adult jackrabbits, with weights at times exceeding , are difficult and taken infrequently, short of by particularly large and aggressive female red-tails.

In the boreal forests of Canada and Alaska, red-tails are fairly dependent on the snowshoe hare (Lepus americanus), falling somewhere behind the great horned owl and ahead of the northern goshawk in their regional reliance on this food source. The hunting preferences of red-tails who rely on snowshoe hares is variable. In Rochester, Alberta, 52% of snowshoe hares caught were adults, such prey estimated to average , and adults, in some years, were six times more often taken than juvenile hares, which averaged an estimated . 1.9–7.1% of adults in the regional population of Rochester were taken by red-tails, while only 0.3–0.8 of juvenile hares were taken by them. Despite their reliance on it, only 4% (against 53.4% of the biomass) of the food by frequency here was made up of hares. On the other hand, in Kluane Lake, Yukon, juvenile hares were taken roughly 11 times more often than adults, despite the larger size of adults here, averaging , and that the overall prey base was less diverse at this more northerly clime. In both Rochester and Kluane Lake, the number of snowshoe hares taken was considerably lower than numbers of ground squirrels taken. The differences of average characteristics of snowshoe hares that were hunted may be partially due to habitat (extent of bog openings to dense forest) or topography.

A diversity of mammals may be consumed opportunistically outside of the main food groups of rodents and leporids, but usually occur in low numbers. A respectable number of the  eastern mole (Scalopus aquaticus) were recorded in studies from Oklahoma and Kansas. Four species of bat have been recorded in their foods. The red-tailed hawks local to the large cave colonies of  Mexican free-tailed bats (Tadarida brasiliensis) in Texas can show surprising agility, some of the same hawks spending their early evening and early morning hours in flight patrolling the cave entrances in order to stoop suddenly on these flighted mammals. Larger miscellaneous mammalian prey are either usually taken as juveniles, like the nine-banded armadillo (Dasypus novemcinctus), or largely as carrion, like the Virginia opossum (Didelphis virginiana). Small carnivorans may be taken, usually consisting of much smaller mustelids, like the least weasels (Mustela nivalis), stoats (Mustela erminea), and long-tailed weasels (Neogale frenata). larger carnivores, such as ringtails (Bassariscus astutus), small American minks (Neovison vison) and adult striped skunk (Mephitis mephitis) reportedly taken by red-tailed hawks. Additionally, red-tailed hawks are considered as potential predators of white-nosed coati (Nasua narica) and kit fox (Vulpes macrotis) Remains of exceptionally large carnivoran species, such as domestic cats (Felis catus), red fox ( Vulpes vulpes) and common raccoon (Procyon lotor) are sometimes found amongst their foods, but most are likely taken as juveniles or consumed only as carrion. <ref name= Bildstein>Bildstein, K. L. (1987). Behavioral ecology of red-tailed hawks (Buteo jamaicensis), rough-legged hawks (Buteo lagopus), northern harriers (Circus cyaneus), and American kestrels (Falco sparverius) in south central Ohio (No. 04; USDA, QL696. F3 B5.).</ref> Many of these medium-sized carnivorans are probably visited as roadkill, especially during the sparser winter months, but carrion has turned up more widely than previously thought. Some nests have been found (to the occasional "shock" of researchers) with body parts from large domestic stock like sheep (Ovis aries), pigs (Sus domesticus), horses (Equus caballus ) and cattle (Bos taurus) (not to mention wild varieties like deer), which red-tails must visit when freshly dead out on pastures and take a couple talonfuls of meat. In one instance, a red-tailed hawk was observed to kill a small but seemingly healthy lamb. These are born heavier than most red-tails at  but in this case, the hawk was scared away before it could consume its kill by the rifle fire of the shepherd who witnessed the instance.

Birds

Like most (but not all) Buteo hawks, red-tailed hawks do not primarily hunt birds in most areas, but can take them fairly often whenever they opportune upon some that are vulnerable. Birds are, by far, the most diverse class in the red-tailed hawk’s prey spectrum, with well over 200 species known in their foods. In most circumstances where birds become the main food of red-tailed hawks, it is in response to ample local populations of galliforms. As these are meaty, mostly terrestrial birds which usually run rather than fly from danger (although all wild species in North America are capable of flight), galliforms are ideal avian prey for red-tails. Some 23 species of galliforms are known to be taken by red-tailed hawks, about a third of these being species introduced by humans. Native quails of all five North American species may expect occasional losses. All 12 species of grouse native to North America are also occasionally included in their prey spectrum.Zwickel, Fred C. and James F. Bendell. (2018). "Sooty Grouse (Dendragapus fuliginosus)". In The Birds of North America. Johnson, Jeff A., Michael A. Schroeder and Leslie A. Robb. (2011). "Greater Prairie-Chicken (Tympanuchus cupido)". In The Birds of North America.  In the state of Wisconsin, two large studies, from Waupun and Green County, found the main prey species to be the ring-necked pheasant (Phasianus colchicus), making up 22.7% of a sample of 176 and 33.8% of a sample of 139, respectively. With a body mass averaging , adult pheasants are among the largest meals that male red-tails are likely to deliver short of adult rabbits and hares and therefore these nests tend to be relatively productive. Despite being not native to North America, pheasants usually live in a wild state. Chickens (Gallus gallus domesticus) are also taken throughout North America, with all Wisconsin studies also found large numbers of them, making up as much as 14.4% of the diet. Many studies reflect that free-ranging chickens are vulnerable to red-tailed hawks although somewhat lesser numbers are taken by them overall in comparison to nocturnal predators (i.e. owls and foxes) and goshawks. In Rochester, Alberta, fairly large numbers of ruffed grouse (Bonasa umbellus) were taken but relatively more juveniles were taken of this species than the two other main contributors to biomass here, snowshoe hare and Townsend’s ground squirrel, as they are fairly independent early on and more readily available. Here the adult grouse was estimated to average  against the average juvenile which in mid-summer averaged .

Beyond galliforms, three other quite different families of birds make the most significant contributions to the red-tailed hawk’s avian diet. None of these three families are known as particularly skilled or swift fliers, but are generally small enough that they would generally easily be more nimble in flight. One of these are the woodpeckers, if only for one species, the  northern flicker (Colaptes auratus), which was the best represented bird species in the diet in 27 North American studies and was even the fourth most often detected prey species of all. Woodpeckers are often a favorite in the diet of large raptors as their relatively slow, undulating flight makes these relatively easy targets. The flicker in particular is a highly numerous species that has similar habitat preferences to red-tailed hawks, preferring fragmented landscapes with trees and openings or parkland-type wooded mosaics, and often forage on the ground for ants, which may make them even more susceptible. Varied other woodpecker species may turn up in their foods, from the smallest to the largest extant in North America, but are much more infrequently detected in dietary studies. Another family relatively often selected prey family are corvids, which despite their relatively large size, formidable mobbing abilities and intelligence are also slower than average fliers for passerines. 14 species of corvid are known to fall prey to red-tailed hawks. In the Kaibab Plateau, the  Steller's jay (Cyanocitta stelleri) were the fourth most identified prey species (10.3% of the diet). American crows are also regularly detected supplemental prey in several areas. One of the most surprising heavy contributors are the icterids, despite their slightly smaller size and tendency to travel in large, wary flocks, 12 species are known to be hunted. One species pair, the meadowlarks, are most often selected as they do not flock in the same ways as many other icterids and often come to the ground, throughout their life history, rarely leaving about shrub-height. The  western meadowlark (Sturnella neglecta), in particular, was the third most often detected bird prey species in North America. It is possible that males, which are generally bold and often select lofty perches from which to display, are most regularly ambushed. One bird species that often flocks with red-winged blackbirds in winter is even better represented in the red-tail’s diet, the non-native  European starling (Sturnus vulgaris), being the second most numerous avian prey species and seventh overall in North America. Although perhaps most vulnerable when caught unaware while calling atonally on a perch, a few starlings (or various blackbirds) may be caught by red-tails which test the agile, twisting murmurations of birds by flying conspicuously towards the flock, to intentionally disturb them and possibly detect lagging, injured individual birds that can be caught unlike healthy birds. However, this behavior has been implied rather than verified.

Over 50 passerine species from various other families beyond corvids, icterids and starlings are included in the red-tailed hawks' prey spectrum but are caught so infrequently as to generally not warrant individual mention. Non-passerine prey taken infrequently may include but are not limited to pigeons and doves, cuckoos, nightjars, kingfishers and parrots.Wiley, J. W., & Wiley, B. N. (1979). "The biology of the White-crowned Pigeon". Wildlife Monographs, (64), 3–54. However, of some interest, is the extreme size range of birds that may be preyed upon. Red-tailed hawks in Caribbean islands seem to catch small birds more frequently due to the paucity of vertebrate prey diversity here. Birds as small as the  elfin woods warbler (Setophaga angelae) and the  bananaquit (Coereba flaveola) may turn up not infrequently as food. How red-tails can catch prey this small and nimble is unclear (perhaps mostly the even smaller nestlings or fledglings are depredated). In California, most avian prey was stated to be between the size of a starling and a quail. Numerous water birds may be preyed upon including at least 22 species of shorebirds, at least 17 species of waterfowl, at least 8 species of heron and egrets and at least 8 species of rails, plus a smaller diversity of grebes, shearwaters and ibises. (2009). "Snowy Plover (Charadrius nivosus)". In The Birds of North America. 

How large of a duck that red-tailed hawks can capture may be variable. In one instance, a red-tailed hawk failed to kill a healthy drake red-breasted merganser (Mergus serrator), with this duck estimated to weigh , later the same red-tail was able to dispatch a malnourished red-necked grebe (Podiceps grisegena) (a species usually about as heavy as the merganser), weighing an estimated . However, in interior Alaska, locally red-tailed hawks have become habitual predators of adult ducks, ranging from  green-winged teal (Anas carolinensis) to  mallard (Anas platyrhynchos). Even larger, occasionally adult Ross's goose (Chen rossii), weighing on average , have been killed as well. Also, a non-native Egyptian goose (Alopochen aegyptiaca), in which adults average , was killed by a red-tail in Texas. There are several known instances of predation on adult greater sage grouse (Centrocercus urophasianus), although mainly females are reported taken, these averaging  depending on region. Even larger, in at least once case a grown hatch-year bird was caught of the rare, non-native Himalayan snowcock (Tetraogallus himalayensis), this species averaging  in adults. Red-tailed hawks are a threat to the poults typically of the wild turkey (Meleagris gallopavo). However this red-tail was unable to overpower the turkey hen. Additionally, young domestic turkeys, weighing up to at least  or more, have been killed by red-tailed hawks. Other than wild turkeys, other larger birds occasionally lose young to red-tails such as trumpeter swans (Cygnus buccinator), sandhill cranes (Grus canadensis) and great blue herons (Ardea herodias).Gerber, Brian D., James F. Dwyer, Stephen A. Nesbitt, Rod C. Drewien, Carol D. Littlefield, T. C. Tacha and P. A. Vohs. (2014). "Sandhill Crane (Antigone canadensis)". In The Birds of North America. 

Reptiles

Early reports claimed relatively little predation of reptiles by red-tailed hawks but these were regionally biased towards the east coast and the upper Midwest of the United States. However, locally the predation on reptiles can be regionally quite heavy and they may become the primary prey where large, stable numbers of rodents and leporids are not to be found reliably. Nearly 80 species of reptilian prey have been recorded in the diet at this point. Most predation is on snakes, with more than 40 species known in the prey spectrum. The most often found reptilian species in the diet (and sixth overall in 27 North American dietary studies) was the gopher snake (Pituophis catenifer). Length–mass allometry in snakes. Biological Journal of the Linnean Society, 108(1), 161–172. This riverine region lacks ground squirrels and has low numbers of leporids. 43.2% of the overall diet here was made up of reptiles, while mammals, made up 40.6%. In the Snake River NCA, the gopher snake was the second most regularly recorded (16.2% of 382 items) prey species over the course of the years, and did not appear to be subject to the extreme population fluctuations of mammalian prey here. Good numbers of smaller colubrids can be taken as well, especially garter snakes. Red-tailed hawks may engage in avoidance behavior to some extent with regard to venomous snakes. For example, on the San Joaquin Experimental Range in California, they were recorded taking 225 gopher snakes against 83 western rattlesnakes (Crotalus oreganus). Based on surveys, however, the rattlesnakes were five times more abundant on the range than the gopher snakes. Nonetheless, at least 15 venomous snakes have been recorded in the red-tailed hawk’s diet. The smallest known snake known to be hunted by red-tailed hawks is the  redbelly snake (Storeria occipitomaculata). Red-tailed hawks have been seen flying off with snake prey that may exceed  in length in some cases. For the eastern indigo snakes (Drymarchon couperi), North America’s longest native snake, usually young and small ones are at risk.

In North America, fewer lizards are typically recorded in the foods of red-tailed hawk than are snakes, probably because snakes are considerably better adapted to cooler, seasonal weather, with an extensive diversity of lizards found only in the southernmost reaches of the contiguous United States. A fair number of lizards were recorded in the diet in southern California and red-tails can be counted among the primary predatory threats to largish lizards in the United States such as the  common chuckawalla (Sauromalus ater). However, the red-tailed hawks ranging into the neotropics regularly take numerous species of lizards. This is especially true of hawks living on islands which are not naturally colonized by small mammals. Insular red-tails commonly pluck up mostly tiny anoles, that may average only  in adult mass, depending on species. Not all tropical lizards taken by red-tailed hawks are so dainty and some are easily as large as most birds and reptiles taken elsewhere such as adults of the  San Esteban chuckwalla (Sauromalus varius) and even those as large as  Cape spinytail iguanas (Ctenosaura hemilopha) and  green iguanas (Iguana iguana) (though it is not clearly noted whether they can take healthy adults iguanas or not). Beyond snakes and lizards, there are a few cases of red-tailed hawks preying on baby or juvenile turtles, i.e. the gopher tortoise (Gopherus polyphemus), the desert tortoise (Gopherus agassizii) and the common snapping turtle (Chelydra serpentina).

Other prey

Records of predation on amphibians is fairly infrequent. It is thought that such prey may be slightly underrepresented, as they are often consumed whole and may not leave a trace in pellets. Their fine bones may dissolve upon consumption. So far as is known, North American red-tailed hawks have preyed upon 9 species of amphibian, four of which are toads. Known amphibian prey has ranged to as small as the  red-backed salamander (Plethodon cinereus), the smallest known vertebrate prey for red-tailed hawks, to the  American bullfrog (Lithobates catesbeianus). Invertebrates, mostly represented by insects like beetles and crickets, are better represented in the stomach contents of red-tailed hawks than their pellets or prey remains. It is possible some invertebrate prey is ingested incidentally, as in other various birds of prey, they can in some cases be actually from the stomachs of birds eaten by the raptor. However, some red-tails, especially immatures early in their hunting efforts, often do spend much of the day on the ground grabbing terrestrial insects and spiders. The red-tailed hawks of Puerto Rico frequently consume Puerto Rican freshwater crabs (Epilobocera sinuatifrons), which average . Other island populations, such as those on Socorro island, also feed often on terrestrial crabs, here often blunting their claws while catching them. Fish are the rarest class of prey based on dietary studies. Among the rare instances of them capturing fish have included captures of wild channel catfish (Ictalurus punctatus), non-native common carp (Cyprinus carpio) and ornamental koi (Cyprinus rubrofuscus) as well some hawks that were seen scavenging on dead chum salmon (Oncorhynchus keta).Tepper, J. M. (2015). "Predators of koi". In 40th World Small Animal Veterinary Association Congress, Bangkok, Thailand, 15–18 May 2015. Proceedings book. pp. 349–350. World Small Animal Veterinary Association.

Interspecies predatory relationships

As easily one of the most abundant of all American raptorial birds, red-tailed hawks have been recorded as interacting with every other diurnal bird of prey. Due to the extreme dietary plasticity of red-tails, the food habits of other birds of prey regularly overlap considerably with red-tails. Furthermore, due to its ability to nest in varied habitats, home ranges also frequently abut those of other raptor species. The most obvious similar species in their range are other Buteo hawks, especially larger species with a similar ecological niche. Two of the larger, more widespread other Buteos are the Swainson's hawk and the ferruginous hawks and, as with many other birds of prey, red-tailed hawks occur in almost the entirety of these birds' breeding ranges.Johnsgard, P. A. (1990). Hawks, eagles, & falcons of North America: biology and natural history. Smithsonian Institution. These species have broadly similar breeding season diets, especially the ferruginous and red-tailed hawks. In some areas, such as Snake River NCA the diets of the two species consist of more than 90% of the same species and body mass of prey taken was similar. Therefore, all three large Buteo hawks defend their territories from each other with almost the same degree of dedication that they defend from others of their own species. In some cases, territorial clashes of Swainson's hawks and red-tailed hawks can last up to 12 hours, however, the birds involved are usually careful to avoid physical contact. Due to the similarities of the foods and their aggressive dispositions towards one another, these Buteos need some degree of partitioning in order to persist alongside one another and this usually is given by habitat preferences. The ferruginous hawk prefers open, practically treeless prairie while of these, the red-tailed hawks prefers the most wooded areas with large trees, while the Swainson's hawk prefer roughly intermediate areas. Where the habitat is more open, such as in Cassia County, Idaho, the Swainson's and ferruginous hawks have the advantage in numbers and red-tails are scarce. However, habitat alterations by humans, such as fire suppression and recovering pasture, usually favor the red-tailed hawk and are to the detriment of the other two species. These practices have caused range expansions of many other species of birds but declines in many others. Of these three Buteo species, the Swainson's hawk is most dissimilar, being a long-distance migrant which travels to South America each winter and, for much of the year, prefers to prey on insects (except for during breeding, when more nutritious food such as ground squirrels are mainly fed to the young). It also breeds notably later than the other two species. Surprisingly, although it's slightly smaller in body mass and has notably smaller (and presumably weaker) feet than ferruginous and red-tailed hawks, the Swainson's is actually usually (but not invariably) dominant in territorial conflicts over the other two. Part of this advantage is that the Swainson's hawk is apparently a superior flier both in long and short-distance flights, with its more pointed wing shape and lower wing loading allowing it more agile, sustained and speedier flight that the bulkier hawks cannot match. Therefore, in north-central Oregon, Swainson's hawks were shown to be more productive, in prairie located trees, and partially displaced prior-breeding red-tails several times, although overall breeding success rates were not perceptibly decreased in the latter hawk. In the Chihuahuan Desert of Mexico, Swainson's hawks usually nested in lowlands and red-tails nested in highlands but interspecies conflicts nevertheless were apparently quite frequent. Usually, the habitat preferences of red-tailed hawks and ferruginous hawks are discrepant enough to keep serious territorial conflicts to a minimum. However, red-tailed hawks and ferruginous hawks occasionally engaged in kleptoparasitism towards one another, usually during winter. Red-tails may be somewhat dominant based on prior reports in food conflicts but the ferruginous hawk may also win these. Where they overlap, the hawk species may adjust their daily routine to minimize contact, which tends to be costly of time and energy and may cause the hawks to abandon their nests for long stretches of time, which in turn leaves their young vulnerable to predation. When habitats change rapidly, often due to human interference, and they nest more closely than natural partitioning would allow, in all three nesting success can decline significantly.

Beyond the Swainson's and ferruginous hawks, six other Buteos co-occur with red-tailed hawks in different parts of North America. Many of these are substantially smaller than red-tails and most serious territorial conflicts with them are naturally mitigated by nesting in deeper wooded areas. One other larger species, the rough-legged buzzard, mostly nests far north of the breeding range of red-tailed hawks. However, in Alaska they sometimes nest in the same areas. The rough-legged buzzards are both cliff and tree nesters and areas used by the two species are not necessarily mutually exclusive but each seems to avoid the other, in part by differing breeding schedules. Wintering rough-legged buzzards may regularly come into conflict over food with red-tailed hawks and seem to be subordinate to the red-tails, with several records of them being chased off both kills and carrion by the red-tailed hawks. During winter their hunting habits may keep them somewhat separate, the rough-legged being a much more aerial hunter, but rough-legged buzzards usually withdrew if a red-tailed hawk flew towards them. There is at least one case, however, of a rough-legged buzzard being the victor of a conflict over a kill with a red-tailed hawk. Red-tailed hawks are conspicuously more aggressive and tend to be dominant over slenderer, medium-sized Buteos such as red-shouldered hawks and zone-tailed hawks (Buteo albonotatus). In Massachusetts, red-shoulder hawks used mixed forests and hardwoods as nesting habitat while red-tails most often used in pitch pine and stunted oaks on Cape Cod. Nesting range overlap here most often occurred on white pine forests. As habitat has opened over time, red-tailed hawks frequently took over former red-shouldered hawk territories, even using their nests in two cases. In north-central Florida, it was found during winter that red-shouldered and red-tailed hawk habitat usage blurred and, because the local habitat favors red-shouldered hawks, they easily outnumbered the number of red-tailed hawks in the area. Therefore, again with sufficient habitat partitioning, the two species can live near one another without negatively effecting one another. In the American southwest and Texas, two relatively large buteonine hawks also live alongside red-tailed hawks, the Harris's hawk (Parabuteo unicinctus) and the white-tailed hawk (Geranoaetus albicaudatus). Usually, habitat preferences kept conflicts to a minimum, with the red-tailed hawk favoring taller, more isolated saguaro cactus for nesting, whereas the other species outnumbered red-tails in areas that were denser and more shrubby. The Harris's hawk was determined to be a superior aerial hunter over red-tailed hawks, and could take down flying birds more routinely.

Hawks and kites from outside the buteonine lineage are usually substantially smaller or at least different enough in diet and habitat to largely avoid heavy conflict with red-tailed hawks. On occasion, northern harriers (Circus hudsonius) which have much lower wing loading, will mob red-tailed hawks out of their home ranges but in winter the red-tails seem to be dominant over them in conflicts over food.Bildstein, K. L. (1988). "Northern Harrier Circus cyaneus". In Handbook of North American birds. R. S. Palmer, ed. New Haven, CT: Yale Univ. Press. pp. 251–303 Among Accipiter hawks, the most similar to the red-tailed hawk in diet and size is the northern goshawk. In some areas, the prey species of these can be very similar and North American populations of goshawks take many more squirrels and leporids than their Eurasian counterparts do. It was found that the feet and striking force of hunting goshawks was more powerful than that of the red-tailed hawk, despite the red-tails being up to 10% heavier in some parts of North America. In a comparative study in the Kaibab Plateau of Arizona, however, it was found that red-tailed hawks had several population advantages. Red-tails were more flexible in diet, although there was a very broad overlap in prey species selected, and nesting habitat than the goshawks were. As red-tailed hawks in conflict with other more closely related Buteo hawks rarely (if ever) result in mortality on either side, goshawks and red-tailed hawks do seem to readily kill one another. Adults of both species have been shown to be able to kill adults of the other.

The great horned owl occupies a similar ecological niche nocturnally to the red-tailed hawk. There have been many studies that have contrasted the ecology of these two powerful raptors. The great horned owl averages heavier and larger footed, with northern populations averaging up to 26% heavier in the owl than the hawk. Also, the diet of red-tailed hawk seems to be more flexible by prey type, as only just over 65% of their diet is made of mammals, whereas great horned owls were more restricted feeders on mammals, selecting them 87.6% of the time. However, the overall prey spectrum of great horned owls includes more species of mammals and birds (but far less reptiles) and the great horned owl can attack prey of a wider size range, including much larger prey items than any taken by red-tailed hawks. Comparative food habits of the Eagle Owl Bubo bubo and the Great Horned Owl Bubo virginianus in six Palearctic and Nearctic biomes. Ornis Scandinavica, 298–306. Great horned owls and red-tailed hawks compete not only for food but more seriously over nesting areas and home ranges. Great horned owls are incapable of constructing nests and readily expropriate existing red-tail nests. The habitat preferences of the two species are quite similar and the owl frequently uses old red-tail nests, but they do seem to prefer more enclosed nest locations where available over the generally open situation around red-tailed hawk nests. Sometimes in warmer areas, the owls may nest sufficiently early to have fledged young by the time red-tails start to lay. However, when there is a temporal overlap in reproductive cycles, the owl sometimes takes over an occupied red-tail nest, causing desertion. Red-tailed hawks have an advantage in staple prey flexibility as aforementioned, while great horned owl populations can be stressed when preferred prey is scarce, especially when they rely on leporids such as hares and jackrabbits. For example, in Alberta, when snowshoe hares were at their population peak, red-tailed hawks did not increase in population despite taking many, with only a slight increase in mean clutch size, whereas the owls fluctuated in much more dramatic ways in accordance with snowshoe hare numbers. The red-tails migratory behavior was considered as the likely cause of this lack of effect, whereas great horned owls remained through the winter and was subject to winter-stress and greater risk of starvation. As a nester, great horned owl has the advantage in terms of flexibility, being somewhat spread more evenly across different habitats whereas in undisturbed areas, red-tailed hawks seem to nest more so in clusters where habitat is favorable. Predatory relationships between red-tailed hawks and great horned owls are quite one-sided, with the great horned owl likely the overall major predator of red-tails. On the other hand, red-tailed hawks are rarely (if ever) a threat to the great horned owl. Occasionally a red-tailed hawk can strike down an owl during the day but only in a few singular cases has this killed an owl. Most predation by the owls on the hawks is directed at nestlings at the point where the red-tails' nestlings are old enough that the parents no longer roost around the nest at night. Up to at least 36% of red-tailed hawk nestlings in a population may be lost to great horned owls. Adult and immature red-tailed hawks are also occasionally preyed upon at night by great horned owls in any season. In one case, a great horned owl seemed to have ambushed, killed and fed upon a full-grown migrating red-tail even in broad daylight. Occasionally, both red-tails and great horned owls will engage each other during the day and, even though the red-tailed hawk has the advantage at this time of day, either may succeed in driving away the other. Despite their contentious relations, the two species may nest quite close to one another. For example, in Saskatchewan, the smallest distance between nests was only . In these close proximity areas all owl nests succeeded while only two red-tail nests were successful. In Waterloo, Wisconsin, the two species were largely segregated by nesting times, as returning red-tailed hawks in April–June were usually able to successfully avoid nesting in groves holding great horned owls, which can begin nesting activities as early as February. In Delaware County, Ohio and in central New York state, divergence of hunting and nesting times usually allowed both species to succeed in nesting. In all three areas, any time the red-tails tried to nest closer to great horned owls, their breeding success rates lowered considerably. It is presumable that sparser habitat and prey resources increased the closeness of nesting habits of the two species, to the detriment of the red-tails. Due to nesting proximity to great horned owls, mature red-tails may have losses ranging from 10 to 26%.

Red-tailed hawks may face competition from a very broad range of predatory animals, including birds outside of typically active predatory families, carnivoran mammals and some reptiles such as snakes. Mostly these diverse kinds of predators are segregated by their hunting methods, primary times of activity and habitat preferences. In California, both the red-tails and western diamondback rattlesnakes (Crotalus atrox) live mainly on California ground squirrel, but the rattlesnake generally attacks the squirrels in and around their burrows, whereas the hawks must wait until they leave the burrows to capture them. Hawks have been observed following American badgers (Taxidea taxus) to capture prey they flush and the two are considered potential competitors, especially in sparse sub-desert areas where the rodent foods they both favor are scarce. Competition over carcasses may occur with American crows, and several crows, usually about six or more, working together can displace a hawk. Another avian scavenger, the turkey vulture (Cathartes aura), is dominated by red-tails and may be followed by red-tails in order to supplant a carcass found by the vulture with their keen sense of smell. In some cases, red-tailed hawks may be considered lessened as food competitors by their lack of specialization. For instance, no serious competition probably occurs between them and Canada lynx (Lynx canadensis) despite both living on snowshoe hares.

Distinguishing territorial exclusionary behavior and anti-predator behavior is difficult in raptorial birds. However, as opposed to other medium to largish hawks which chase off red-tails most likely as competition, in much smaller raptors such as kestrels and smaller Accipiter hawks, their aggressive reaction to red-tailed hawks is almost certainly an anti-predator behavior. Although less prolific than goshawks, some eagles and, especially, great horned owls, red-tailed hawks can and do prey upon smaller birds of prey. The following species of accipitrid have been known to fall prey to red-tailed hawks, potentially including nestlings, fledglings, immatures and/or adults: swallow-tailed kite (Elanoides forficatus), Mississippi kite (Ictinia mississippiensis), white-tailed kite (Elanus leucurus), northern harrier (Circus hudsonius), sharp-shinned hawk (Accipiter striatus), Cooper's hawk (Accipiter cooperii), goshawks, gray hawk (Buteo plagiatus), red-shouldered hawk and broad-winged hawk (Buteo platypterus). Additionally, there are records of red-tailed hawks hunting 9 species of owl, ranging in size from the  northern saw-whet owl (Aegolius acadius) to juveniles of the  great gray owl (Strix nebulosa) and seemingly adults of the  barred owl (Strix varia). Red-tails will also hunt falcons including adult American kestrels (Falco sparverius) and merlins (Falco columbarius) and presumed nestlings of the peregrine falcon (Falco peregrinus). When hunting other raptorial birds, red-tailed hawks seem to ambush them from a perch, diving suddenly and unexpectedly upon spotting the quarry and tend to have the greatest success when the raptorial prey is distracted, such as those migrating on windy days, feeding on their own prey and tending to their nest.

In turn, red-tailed hawks may engage in behavior that straddles territorial exclusion and anti-predator behavior to the two much larger raptors in North America which actively hunt, the eagles. Red-tails are most commonly seen flying towards and aggressively displacing both flying bald eagles (Haliaeetus leucocephalus) and golden eagles (Aquila chrysaetos), but may also, to the contrary, unobtrusively duck down out of flight to an inconspicuous perch when an eagle is spotted. The behavioral variation is probably related to the activity of hawks, which may feel the need to protect their nests and food resources while actively breeding but are not usually willing to risk their lives in attacking an eagle while migrating or wintering. At times mobbing behavior of smaller raptors may cause both eagles to turn over and present their large talons to their attacker, which can be dangerous for the smaller hawk. Besides the great horned owl, the two eagle species are the only known animals known to regularly threaten red-tailed hawks of any age. In particular, the golden eagle is probably the greatest daytime threat to fledged immature and adult red-tails, as these have turned up in many dietary studies of the powerful eagle. Less efficient as a predator of red-tails, bald eagles nonetheless have been recording killing adults in some cases or, more often, depredating red-tailed hawk nests. On occasion, this may result in the bald eagle bringing the nestling red-tails to their own nest and, for some reason, not killing them. In some cases, the bald eagles inadvertently actually raise the nestling red-tails themselves and the baby red-tailed hawks may successfully fledge. In one case, a red-tailed hawk was observed to kill a bald eagle chick, whether this was predatory or competitive, it quickly abandoned the dead nestling after the eagle’s parents returned. On several tropical islands, which are often shared only with other hawks, owls and falcons of only medium or small size and typically lack larger raptors or carnivorans, the red-tailed hawk may be the largest native predator and will, in these cases, be considered the apex predator. Other than large birds of prey, extensive records of predation on red-tailed hawks is surprisingly poor, in spite of several populations recording nestlings and eggs disappearing through presumed acts of natural predation. The most likely major predator of eggs and nestlings that disappear is the raccoon which, during its nocturnal foraging, is a notorious enemy of nearly any kind of birds nest. It is also known that unidentified large snakes, probably consisting of the same species that the red-tails so readily predate during broad daylight, will prey upon nestling red-tails. In California, common ravens were recorded preying on the downy young of red-tailed hawks. Other corvids, including blue jays (Cyanocitta cristata), California scrub jays (Aphelocoma californica) and crows, are known to feed on eggs and small nestlings either when nest attendance is atypically low by the hawks or when they can successful harass the parent hawks via mobbing so severely that they temporarily leave the nest. Blackflies (Simulium canonicolum) have been recorded as killing several red-tail chicks through blood loss. There are also several cases of possible prey turning the tables on red-tailed hawks and either maiming or killing them. This is especially true of snakes, with some prey species of Pituophis, Pantherophis and Coluber known to overpower and nearly kill, often the hawk survives only if by human intervention. Not infrequently prey such as coral snakes and rattlesnakes may succeed in killing red-tailed hawks with their venom, even if they themselves are also killed and partially consumed. Peregrine falcons are also known to kill red-tailed hawks that have come too close to their nests by stooping upon them.

Reproduction

Courtship and pre-laying behaviors
Pairs either court for the first time or engage in courtship rituals to strengthen pre-existing pair bonds before going into the breeding. The breeding season usually begins in late February through March, but can commence as early as late December in Arizona and late January in Wisconsin or to the opposite extreme as late as mid-April as in Alberta. In this pre-nesting period, high-circling with much calling will occur. One or both members of a pair may be involved. The courtship display often involves dangling legs, at times the pair will touching each other's wings and male's feet may touch female's back, she may occasionally roll over and present talons. Food passes are rarely reported. High soaring occurs aseasonally. Circling above territory tends to be done noisily and conspicuously, helping insure against possible takeovers. Spring circling of a pair can be a prelude to copulation. A typical sky-dance involves the male hawk climbing high in flight with deep, exaggerated beats and then diving precipitously on half-closed wings at great speed, checking, and shooting back up, or often plunging less steeply and repeating process in a full rollercoaster across the sky. Sky-dances are done on periphery of the pair’s territory and it appears to designate the territory limits, occasionally one male’s sky-dance may also trigger a sky-dance by a neighboring male, who may even run a parallel course in the sky. Sky-dances no longer occur after late incubation. Boundary flight displays may be engaged in by all four birds of 2 adjacent pairs. Cartwheeling with interlocking talons is also seen occasionally in spring, almost always a territorial male expelling an intruding one, the latter often being a second or third year male that is newly mature. A perched display, with fluffed-out breast feathers may too occur at this time. Even males that are in spring migration have been recorded engaging in a separate display: circling at slow speed before partially closing wings, dropping legs with talons spread and tilting from side-to-side. A female hawk is usually around when migrating male does this but she does not engage in this display herself. The area of occupancy of breeding territories by pairs is variable based on regional habitat composition. Here and elsewhere, both members of the pair stay quite close together throughout winter if they are sedentary. On the other hand, migrant populations tend to separate while migrating and return to the same territory to find its prior mate, sometimes before they reach their home range. In Alaska, returning migrant pairs were able to displace lone red-tailed hawks that had stayed on residence, especially lone males but sometimes even lone females. In general, the red-tailed hawk will only take a new mate when its original mate dies. Although pairs often mate for life, replacement of mates can often be quite fast for this common bird species. In one case in Baja California, when a female was shot on 16 May, the male of that pair was seen to have selected a new mate the following day.Anthony, A. W. (1893). Birds of San Pedro Mártir, Lower California. Zoe 4: 228–247. In copulation, the female, when perched, tilts forward, allowing the male to land with his feet lodged on her horizontal back. The female twists and moves her tail feathers to one side, while the mounted male twists his cloacal opening around the female's cloaca. Copulation lasts 5 to 10 seconds and during pre-nesting courtship in late winter or early spring can occur numerous times each day.

Nests

They may too nest on virtually any man-made structures with some variety of ample ledges or surface space and good views of the surrounding environment (i.e. powerline poles, radio transmission towers, skyscraper buildings). Much variation is recorded in nest usage behavior, many red-tails build new nests every year despite prior nests sometimes being in good standing and unoccupied, some may reuse a nest in subsequent years or may leave a nest for a year and then come back to it the following year. A red-tailed hawk nest is typically located in a gradient zone between woods with tall, mature trees, if available, and openings whether this is composed of shrubland, grassland or agricultural areas. Nest sites vary greatly in topography and vegetative composition. While tree nests are largely preferred, occasionally they nest on cliff ledges may be utilized even where other nest sites are presumably available. Cliff-nesting by the Red-tailed Hawk in Moist Karst Forests of Northern Puerto Rico. Journal of Raptor Research, 43(2), 167–169. At times, unlike great horned owls, red-tailed hawks have been recorded nesting in surprisingly unbroken forests. In North Dakota, nest sites tend to be concentrated along wooded river drainages. Compared to Swainson's hawks and ferruginous hawks, red-tailed hawk nests are usually in taller trees and are closer to waterways.Smith, D. G. (1971). Population dynamics, habitat selection, and partitioining of breeding raptors in the eastern Great Basin of Utah. PhD diss., Brigham Young Univ., Provo, UT. In Puerto Rico, nests are most often found in transitional zone between dry lowlands and mountainous cloud forests, with trees typically taller than their neighbors to allow views of more than half of their home ranges. More than 21 tree species were recorded used in Puerto Rico. Tree species is seemingly unimportant to red-tailed hawks. In some parts of Arizona, saguaro cactus were used exclusively as nesting sites. Alternately, old nests of other Buteo hawks, corvids, golden eagles and even leaf nests of tree squirrels have also been used by red-tailed hawks. Both members of the pair will build the nests but the female spends more time forming the bowl, with the greatest activity often in the morning and nest building completed in a week or less. The nest is constructed of twigs, and lined with bark, pine needles, corn cobs, husks, stalks, aspen catkins, or other plant lining matter. Lining the nest may be for warning other red-tails of the active use of a nest. In moderate to northern climes, red-tailed hawks tend to face to the south or west, presumably to make them less vulnerable to strong northeasterly storm winds.

Eggs
In most of the interior contiguous United States the first egg is laid between mid-March and early April, ranging from 3 to 5 weeks after the nest is constructed, with the clutch completed 2 to 5 days after the initial egg is laid. The average date of the laying the first egg can be variable: peaking mid-January in Puerto Rico, averaging 9 March in Arizona, 26 March in the Front Range Urban Corridor and 1 May in Alberta. The mean initiation of clutches may bump weeks later if  or more of snow is still on the ground in Wisconsin during March. A clutch of one to three eggs is laid in March or April, depending upon latitude, with four eggs being uncommon and five and perhaps even six increasingly rare. Clutch size depends almost exclusively on the availability of prey for the adults. At the species level, body size also determines clutch size. For example, while the total clutch weighs up to 18% of the females weight and the clutch size averages 2 to 3, a larger raptor like the golden eagle lays a smaller clutch, usually not more than two, that weighs less than 10% in total of the female’s body mass, whereas a smaller raptor like the kestrel lays a larger clutch averaging five that weighs 50% of the females weight. Average clutch size vary from 1.96 in Alaska when prey populations were low up to 2.96 in Washington.Henny, C. J., & Wight, H. M. (1972). Population ecology and environmental pollution: Red-tailed and Cooper's hawks (No. 2, pp. 229–250). US Fish and Wildlife Service. Eggs are laid approximately every other day. Average egg sizes in height and width (each with a sample size of 20) are in the following subspecies- B. j. borealis: ; B. j. calurus: ; B. j. fuertesi: . The eggs of red-tailed hawks are mostly white, sometimes with a faint buffy wash; at times the eggs manifest a sparsely or heavily marked with blotches of buff, pale reddish-brown, dark brown, or purple. The markings often appear indistinctly and may combine to form a fine speckling. They are incubated primarily by the female, with the male substituting when she leaves to hunt or merely stretch her wings. Rarely do the males incubate more than four hours of daylight. The male brings most food to the female while she incubates.

Hatching, development and brooding

After 28 to 35 days of incubation (averaging about three days longer in the Caribbean as does fledgling as compared to North American red-tails), the eggs hatch over 2 to 4 days. Like most raptorial birds, the nestlings are altricial and nidicolous at hatching. Hatchlings average  in body mass with no difference in sizes of the sexes until the young are about 29 days old for mass and 21 days or so for external linear standard measurements such as bill and talon size. The female broods them while the male provides most of the food to the female and the young, which are also known as eyasses (pronounced "EYE-ess-ez"). The female feeds the eyasses after tearing the food into small pieces. The young red-tails are active by the second day when they issue soft peeping calls, bounce, and wave continuously with their wings. By day 7, the bouncing and peeping begin to wane, and young start to peck at prey in their nest. Nestlings emit high whistling notes (usually in response to adults overhead) by day 10, sit up on tarsometatarsi by day 15, become aggressive toward intruders by day 16, strike out with talons and wings by day 21, begin to stretch wings and exercise regularly by day 30. After 42 to 46 days, the eyasses begin to leave the nest and tear apart prey for themselves. The amount of food brought to the nest daily varies considerably, based on brood size and prey availability. Brooding is strenuous for parent red-tails and both members of the pair usually lose some weight, especially the female. During brooding the female may become aggressive to intruders, including humans. In the east, red-tailed hawk females rarely defend nests from humans but historically in California and quite often still in Alaska, some female will dive repeatedly and "savagely", sometimes snapping off large branches in her temper, occasionally stunning herself or inadvertently knocking down her own youngster if it is attempting to fledge. Apparently, the less extensive prior exposure they have to humans may make mature females more aggressive towards humans near the nest. Although development is asynchronical in most nests, runting may sometimes be recorded and even siblicide may occur, with the parents feeding the weaker, younger chicks less so and both the siblings and parents occasionally aggressively pecking the "runts" of the nest. Ultimately, the runt in such cases does not usually survive and may be either found crushed in the nest, discarded out of the nest after starvation or consumed by the parents or the siblings. However, as a whole, such killings are fairly rare and only occur when food supplies are extremely low, often this being in sync with poor spring weather (such as overly rainy or cold conditions). If there is too much food, such as California ground squirrels in California, the parents will discard remains after a day or two since decomposition of their prey invites infection, other diseases and blood-sucking insects to the nest that may endanger the nestlings. However, after about four weeks, the female often stops discarding leftover prey and the increased presence of flies may form somewhat of a risk to disease in the young but may also merely get the young to leave the nest sooner. One nest in California had two females and one male attended to; the male performed his usual function but both females would brood and tend to the nest. Additionally, bald eagles have been recorded to occasionally adopt red-tail fledglings into their nests. As recorded in Shoal Harbor Migratory Bird Sanctuary located near Sydney, British Columbia, on 9 June 2017, a juvenile red-tailed hawk was taken by a pair of bald eagles back to their nest, whereupon the chick, originally taken as prey, was accepted into the family by both the parents and the eagles' three fledglings. After surviving six weeks amongst the eagles, the fledgling, nicknamed "Spunky" by birdwatchers, had successfully begun learning to hunt and fly, showing that the aggressive hawk was able to survive amongst a nest of much larger adoptive siblings.

Fledging and immaturity

Young typically leave the nest for the first time and attempt their first flights at about 42–46 days after hatching but usually they stay very near the nest for the first few days. During this period, the fledglings remain fairly sedentary, though they may chase parents and beg for food. Parents deliver food directly or, more commonly, drop it near the young. Short flights are typically undertaken for the first 3 weeks after fledgling and the young red-tails activity level often doubles. About 6 to 7 weeks after fledging, the young begin to capture their own prey, which often consists of insects and frogs that the young hawks can drop down to onto the ground with relative ease. At the point they are 15 weeks old, they may start attempts to hunt more difficult mammal and bird prey in sync with their newly developed skills for sustained flight, and most are efficient mammal predators fairly soon after their first attempts at such prey. Shortly thereafter, when the young are around 4 months of age, they become independent of their parents. In some extreme cases, juvenile red-tails may prolong their association with their parents to as long as they are half a year old, as was recorded in Wisconsin. After dispersing from the parental territory, juveniles from several nests may congregate and interact in a juvenile staging area. Although post-fledgling siblings in their parents care are fairly social, they are rarely seen together post distribution from their parents range. Usually, newly independent young hawks leave the breeding area and migrate, if necessary, earlier than adults do, however the opposite was true in the extreme north of Alaska, where adults were recorded to leave first. Immature hawks in migratory populations tend to distribute further in winter than adults from these populations do. Immatures attempting to settle for the winter often are harassed from territory to territory by older red-tails, settling only in small, marginal areas. In some cases, such as near urban regions, immatures may be driven to a small pockets of urban vegetation with less tree cover and limited food resources. When a distant adult appears, immatures may drop from a prominent perch to a more concealed one. In some cases, hungry immature red-tails have been recorded making attempts at hunting prey beyond their capacities, expending valuable energy, such as healthy adults of larger carnivorans such as coyotes (Canis latrans), foxes and badgers and healthy flying passerines. There are some cases of red-tailed hawks, presumably younger than two years of age, attempting to breed, often with an adult bird of the opposite sex. Such cases have been recorded in Alberta, Arizona and Wisconsin, with about half of these attempts being successful at producing young.Millsap, B. A. (1981). Distributional status of falconiformes in west central Arizona: with notes on ecology, reproductive success and management. US Bureau of Land Management, Phoenix District Office. However, while adult plumage and technically sexual maturity is attained at two years old, many red-tails do not first successfully breed until they are around 3 years of age.

Breeding success and longevity

Breeding success is variable due to many factors. Estimated nesting success usually falls between 58% and 93%. Nesting success rates are probably drive primarily by prey populations, regional habitat composition, competition levels with other red-tailed hawks, predation rates (often due to great horned owls or perhaps raccoons) and human disturbance levels. In Oregon specifically, nesting success varied primarily based on "dispersion and density of perches" secondarily to ground squirrel abundance and whether the nest of other pairs red-tails was directly visible from a nest. Repeated disturbances at the nest early in the nesting cycle may cause abandonment of eggs or nestlings in some cases, but seemingly pairs are less likely to abandon the young later in the season in cases of human disturbance. 30% of nesting deaths in a study from Wisconsin were from nestlings falling to their death or the nest collapsing. In Puerto Rico, habitat appeared to be the primary driver of breeding success, as in lowland pastures nesting success was 43% producing a mean number of fledglings of 1.5 whereas in cloud forest success was 34% producing a mean of 0.7 fledglings. A modelling study in Puerto Rico showed that, apart from adult survival, nestling survival had the second greatest influence on population growth. In Wyoming, 12 pairs on a 12 square mile tract produced an average of 1.4 young per pair. In comparison, the mean number of fledglings was 0.96 in Michigan, 1.36 in Montana and was 1.4 in the Appalachians. In Wisconsin, the number of young successfully to fledge ranged from 1.1 to 1.8 from year to year probably depending on staple prey numbers. The record lifespan in wild for a red-tailed hawk is 25 years and 5 months from banding studies. In comparison, lifespans of up to 29.5 years have been recorded in captivity. In the wild, other red-tailed hawks have lived for at least 25 years, for example, Pale Male was born in 1990, and in Spring 2014 is still raising eyasses. However, of 5195 banded wild red-tailed hawks in one bander’s recordings, only 31 were reported to have survived to 17 years of age and only 11 survived for 20 years. The average mortality rate at 1 year of age for red-tails is 54% and thereafter is around 20% from banding sources. The estimated average lifespan of red-tailed hawks who attain maturity, per Palmer (1988), was claimed as only 6 to 7 years. The main causes of mortality considered as electrocution on power lines, other collisions, shooting, consumption of poisoned baits set for other animals and collision with vehicles and other crafts. While most mortality of young red-tails is at least mainly due to natural causes, mortality of fledged or older red-tails is now mostly attributable to human killing, accidental or intentional, as well as flying into manmade materials. Hawks in urban areas are threatened by the use of rat traps and poisoned bait to kill rodents. This generally consists of warfarin cookies which induce internal bleeding in rats and mice, and a hawk that ingests rodents who have consumed rat poison can itself be affected. Red-tailed hawks are also vulnerable to fatal bacterial infections include peritonitis, myocarditis, granulamotous, sarcocystosis and mycobateriosis as well as some forms of viral infection, to which immature hawks especially, as they often have less access to coverage in poor weather conditions, are most vulnerable. Neither this nor other Buteo hawks were found to be highly susceptible to long-term DDT egg-shell thinning due to being part, generally, of relatively short, terrestrial-based food chains.

 Relationship with humans 

 Use in falconry 
The red-tailed hawk is a popular bird in falconry, particularly in the United States where the sport of falconry is tightly regulated; this type of hawk is widely available and is frequently assigned to apprentice falconers. Red-tailed hawks are highly tameable and trainable, with a more social disposition than all other falcons or hawks other than the Harris's hawk. They are also long lived and fairly disease resistant, allowing a falconer to maintain a red-tailed hawk as a hunting companion for potentially up to two decades. There are fewer than 5,000 falconers in the United States, so despite their popularity any effect on the red-tailed hawk population, estimated to be about one million in the United States, is negligible.

Not being as swift as falcons or accipiters, red-tailed hawks are usually used to hunt small game such as rabbits and squirrels, as well as larger quarry such as Hares. However, some individuals may learn to ambush game birds on the ground before they are able to take off and accelerate to full speed, or as they have fly into cover after a chase. Some have even learned to use a falcon-like diving stoop to capture challenging game birds such as pheasants in open country.

In the course of a typical hunt, a falconer using a red-tailed hawk most commonly releases the hawk and allows it to perch in a tree or other high vantage point. The falconer, who may be aided by a dog, then attempts to flush prey by stirring up ground cover. A well-trained red-tailed hawk will follow the falconer and dog, realizing that their activities produce opportunities to catch game. Once a raptor catches game, it does not bring it back to the falconer. Instead, the falconer must locate the bird and its captured prey, "make in" (carefully approach) and trade the bird off its kill in exchange for a piece of offered meat.

 Feathers and Native American use 
The feathers and other parts of the red-tailed hawk are considered sacred to many indigenous people and, like the feathers of the bald eagle and golden eagle, are sometimes used in religious ceremonies and found adorning the regalia of many Native Americans in the United States; these parts, most especially their distinctive tail feathers, are a popular item in the Native American community. As with the other two species, the feathers and parts of the red-tailed hawk are regulated by the eagle feather law, which governs the possession of feathers and parts of migratory birds.

 Citations 

Cited sources

 External links 

Red-tailed hawk Species Account – Cornell Lab of Ornithology
Red-tailed hawk – Buteo jamaicensis – USGS Patuxent Bird Identification InfoCenter
Red-tailed hawk Pictures at Fordham University
 North American Falconers Association
Comparison of Adult & Immature tails
Discussion of Krider's and Harlan's forms and identification issues
Photo Field Guide on Flickr
"Red-tailed hawk" in The Encyclopedia of Life
 
 

 Historical works 
 John James Audubon. The Red-tailed Hawk in Ornithological Biography vol. 1 (1831), pp. 265–272 (also on WikiSource, see right). The Red-tailed Buzzard in The Birds of America vol. 1 (1840), pp. 32–38. [The 1840 edition appears to be a combination of the two companion works from the early 1830s: the plates from Birds of America and the descriptions from Ornithological Biography.]
 John James Audubon. The Black Warrior in Ornithological Biography vol. 1 (1831), pp. 441–443 (also on WikiSource, see right). Harlan's Buzzard in The Birds of America'' vol. 1 (1840), pp. 38–40.

Live nest cameras 
Live nestcam at Cornell University
Live nestcam at Syracuse University

red-tailed hawk
Falconry
Birds of North America
Birds of the Dominican Republic
red-tailed hawk
Articles containing video clips
red-tailed hawk